Fred Kelly  (1877–?) was a Welsh international footballer.

He was part of the Wrexham squad in 1899–1900.

He was part of the Wales national football team between 1899 and 1902, playing 3 matches. He played his first match on 4 March 1899 against Ireland and his last match on 22 February 1902 against Ireland.

See also
 List of Wales international footballers (alphabetical)
 List of Wales international footballers born outside Wales

References

1877 births
Wrexham A.F.C. players
Welsh footballers
Wales international footballers
Place of birth missing
Date of death missing
Association footballers not categorized by position